Steve Weiner is a Canadian writer and animator. He was born in Milwaukee, Wisconsin in 1947, and grew up in Wausau, Wisconsin where his father taught chemistry at the Wausau campus of the University of Wisconsin. Steve Weiner later studied writing at the University of California. In 1970 he married Deborah Blacker. Blacker. He continued to live and work in California for most of the 1970s, including a period working for Frank deFelitta, the film director and screenwriter. He is a citizen of the United States and Canada and a Permanent Resident of the UK.

Weiner's exposure to the film industry, and his interest particularly in contemporary animated film from Eastern Europe --- particularly the work of Jan Lenica, Daniel Szczechura and Walerian Borowczyck --- as well as the Brothers Quay has been a marked influence on his work. He has published three novels.

Published works

Weiner's 1993 debut novel The Museum of Love was published by Bloomsbury UK and subsequently by Kodansha in Japan, The Overlook Press in the United States and Canada, and Belfond in France. It earned comparisons to William S. Burroughs, Céline, Jean Genet, David Lynch and Todd Haynes for its blend of surrealism and dark eroticism, and was a nominee for the inaugural Giller Prize.

His second novel, The Yellow Sailor, was published in 2001 by the Overlook Press of Woodstock & New York. The novel consists almost entirely of curt, sardonic dialogue interrupted by terse descriptions of a grotesque world of anti-semitism and nationalism that surrounds its merchant-sailor protagonists in the Europe of World War I. The novel's title is also the name of their ship, which sails from Hamburg in 1914. The cover of the North American hardcover and paperback editions is illustrated with a painting by Otto Dix, "Abschied von Hamburg," dated 1921.

Weiner's third novel, Sweet England, was published in 2010 by New Star Books, a Vancouver-based literary press. It tells the story of a man of no known origin and unstable personality and his efforts to re–enter society after a long and unexplained absence. The man, who is given the name Jack by another character he encounters, falls into a relationship with a woman named Brenda Lee, and much of the novel concerns the relationship between Jack and Brenda, whose death is the occasion for a Coroner's Inquest that provides the action for the last third of the novel. The novel's action takes place against a backdrop of post-Thatcher London, rendered by Weiner into a dark and phantasmagorical dreamscape. The cover illustration is also by the Brothers Quay, the London-based animated filmmakers Stephen and Timothy Quay.

Weiner's writing is characterised by its exceptionally bold telegraphic style, one that has a truly cinematic feel in the sheer convulsive power of the images that are evoked and their deeply unsettling visionary tone. He would even seem to defy the cinema (unless one were to think of the more theatrical and stylized approach of certain animators and graphic artists). He is, however, also able to achieve in his phantasmagorical and often violent universe an exceedingly delicate and fragile realm of characters despite their being inhabited by a world all too overwhelmingly hostile and mad.

Bibliography

The Museum of Love, London: Bloomsbury, 1993
The Yellow Sailor, New York: Overlook Press, 2001
Sweet England, Vancouver: New Star Books, 2010

References 

1947 births
Canadian male novelists
20th-century Canadian novelists
21st-century Canadian novelists
Living people
20th-century Canadian male writers
21st-century Canadian male writers